The Nashville Stars were a professional basketball team that played in the World Basketball League (WBL) in 1991. They were located in Nashville, Tennessee, and played their home games at the Nashville Municipal Auditorium. Prior to arriving in Nashville, the franchise played in Las Vegas, Nevada, as the Las Vegas Silver Streaks. The Stars disbanded after the 1991 season in which they placed fourth in the Southern Division with a 23–28 record.

The team was led by veteran collegiate coach Ron Greene. He was assisted by Kevin Legate, who had played at Nashville's Belmont University.

Notable players included 1988 WBL Most Valuable Player and three-time All-WBL selection Jamie Waller and 1991 All-WBL selection Daren Queenan, who was named to the 1991 All-WBL team. The only Star to reach the National Basketball Association was Cedric Hunter, who played one minute of one game with the Charlotte Hornets in 1992.

Radio broadcasts were carried locally by WAMB 1160 AM with local talk show host Gregory Ruff as the play-by-play announcer.

References

1991 establishments in Tennessee
1991 disestablishments in Tennessee
Basketball teams established in 1991
Basketball teams in Tennessee
Sports clubs disestablished in 1991
Sports in Nashville, Tennessee
World Basketball League teams